Joanna is an unincorporated community in  southern Berks County, Pennsylvania, United States. Joanna sits in southern Robeson Township, near the borough of New Morgan, and is also near Caernarvon Township and near the Pennsylvania Turnpike. The Twin Valley School District serves Joanna; the high school is located close to the village.

History
The community was named after the nearby Joanna blast furnace. The old furnace is preserved as Joanna Furnace Historic Site. A post office called Joanna Furnace was established in 1830, was renamed Joanna in 1890, and the post office was discontinued in 1964.

References

Unincorporated communities in Berks County, Pennsylvania
Unincorporated communities in Pennsylvania